The 2012 Porsche City Index Australian Carrera Cup Championship was an Australian motor racing competition for Porsche 911 GT3 Cup cars. It was sanctioned by the Confederation of Australian Motor Sport (CAMS) as a National Championship, and was recognised by them as the eighth Australian Carrera Cup Championship. Porsche Cars Australia Pty Ltd was appointed as the Category Manager by CAMS for the Championship.

The championship was won by Craig Baird.

Teams and drivers

The following teams and drivers contested the championship.

Note: Only Porsche 911 GT3 Cup cars were eligible to compete in the championship.

Race calendar
The championship was contested over an eight round series with each round decided over a number of races with a minimum total race time of one hour at each round.

Championship summary
Round 1 in Adelaide was won by returning 2004 Champion Alex Davison from defending champion Craig Baird with Daniel Gaunt third. The elite class was won by James Koundouris.

Round 2 was held as a support race to the Australian Grand Prix at the Albert Park Grand Prix Circuit. A classy field assembled including former Grand Prix winner Heinz-Harald Frentzen, former V8 Supercar Champion and Bathurst 1000 winner Mark Skaife, 2011 runner-up Jonny Reid and returning from racing sports cars in the USA, James Davison. But the regulars showed the way with Craig Baird winning all three races, followed by Reid, with round 1 winner Alex Davison third. The elite class was won by Max Twigg.

Points system
Points were awarded to the first 25 finishers in each race as per the following table.

In addition to competing for the outright championship, each driver was classified as either Professional or Elite and contested the relevant class title. Points were awarded for class places in each race on the same basis as for the outright championship.

Championship standings

Outright

Professional Class
Craig Baird won the Professional Class pointscore from Jonny Reid and Alex Davison.

Elite Class
Max Twigg won the Elite Class from James Koundouris and Tony Bates.

See also
 Australian Carrera Cup Championship
 Porsche Supercup
 Porsche 911 GT3
 Porsche 997

References

External links
 Natsoft Race Results, racing.natsoft.com.au > Circuit Racing > Year = 2012

Australian Carrera Cup Championship seasons
Carrera Cup Championship